Litany of Echoes is the sixth studio album from James Blackshaw. It was released in the United States on June 17, 2008.

Track listing
"Gate of Ivory" – 5:20
"Past Has Not Passed" – 12:38
"Echo and Abyss" – 12:10
"Infinite Circle" – 5:54
"Shroud" – 11:44
"Gate of Horn" – 5:20

References

2008 albums
James Blackshaw albums
Instrumental albums